Craig Gilliam (born 1945) is a former American football player and coach. He served as the head football coach at Lane College in Jackson, Tennessee from 1993 to 1994.

References

1945 births
Living people
American football cornerbacks
Lane Dragons football coaches
Tennessee State Tigers football coaches
Tennessee State Tigers football players